Taylor Johnson may refer to:
 Taylor Johnson (rugby league)
 Taylor Johnson (tennis)
 Taylor Johnson, musician in the David Crowder Band

See also
 Taylor-Johnson, a surname